Voorst is a municipality and a town in the eastern Netherlands.

Population centres 
 Appen (near a wood where nice walks can be taken)
 Bussloo (with a recreation centre with a small lake and beach)
 De Kar (near a motorway junction (A1, Amsterdam- Berlin)
 De Vecht
 De Wijk
 Gietelo (castle ruin of Nijenbeek on the IJssel dyke)
 Klarenbeek (partly in the municipality Apeldoorn; small railroad station)
 Klein-Amsterdam
 Nijbroek
 Posterenk (also near the A1, with an old Dutch wind-mill)
 Spekhoek
 Steenenkamer, actually an outskirt of Deventer
 Terwolde
 Teuge (with an airfield, where parachuting is taught)
 Twello, half-way between Apeldoorn and Deventer, which is  the main village of the municipality, having over 11,000 inhabitants; the town-hall, some industry, most schools, a railway station, a shopping centre etc. can be found there
 Voorst, an old village along the road between Apeldoorn and Zutphen, with a beautiful old church; 1 mile south of Voorst, another small railroad station was opened in 2006
 Wilp, a tiny village on the IJssel opposite to Deventer; it has a small, very old church and a hospital for mentally handicapped people; the village already existed in 768;  Saint Lebuinus built a chapel there; the name is  allegedly derived from wel-apa that is: well-water; it is possible, that prehistoric Celtic or Germanic people worshipped a holy well there.

Dutch topographic map of the municipality of Voorst, June 2015

Notable people 

 Ludolph Anne Jan Wilt Sloet van de Beele (1806 in Voorst – 1890) the Governor-General of the Dutch East Indies 1861/1866
 Johannes Gijsbertus Bastiaans (1812 in Wilp - 1875) a Dutch organist, composer and music theorist
 Anthony Winkler Prins (1817 in Voorst – 1908) a Dutch writer of the Winkler Prins encyclopedia. 
 Willem Anne Assueer Jacob Schimmelpenninck van der Oye (1834 in Voorst – 1889) a Dutch baron and politician
 Jan Terlouw (born 1931 in Kamperveen) a retired Dutch politician, physicist and author
 Evert Jan Baerends (born 1945 in Voorst) a Dutch theoretical chemist and academic

Sport 
 Jan-Dirk Nijkamp (born 1964 in Voorst) a Dutch sprint canoer who competed in the 1992 Summer Olympics
 Jurgen Streppel (born 1969 in Voorst) a retired football player with 373 club caps
 Robert Horstink (born 1981 in Twello) a volleyball player, competed in the 2004 Summer Olympics

Gallery

References

External links

Official website

 
Municipalities of Gelderland
Populated places in Gelderland